Gampsocleis glabra is a species of bush crickets belonging to the subfamily Tettigoniinae. It is found over most of mainland Europe East to the Caspian and Black Sea.

Biology
Gampsocleis glabra feeds on insects, sometimes grasses, heather and other plants in dry regions such as steppes, on nutrient-poor grasslands and in heathland with high grass cover.

References

Orthoptera of Europe
Insects described in 1786
Tettigoniinae